The National Encyclopedia of Uzbekistan is a general-knowledge encyclopedia written in Uzbek. The majority of the articles in the National Encyclopedia were directly taken from the Uzbek Soviet Encyclopedia.

While the Uzbek Soviet Encyclopedia was published in 14 volumes, the National Encyclopedia of Uzbekistan has only 12, much smaller volumes. The first volume of the National Encyclopedia was published in 2000. The final 12th volume was published in 2005.

History 

The National Encyclopedia of Uzbekistan was published in Tashkent from 2000 to 2005 by the National Encyclopedia of Uzbekistan State Scientific Publishing House. The encyclopedia was printed in Cyrillic even though it was published long after Uzbekistan introduced the Latin script to Uzbek. In 2013, all of the articles of the National Encyclopedia were added to the Uzbek Wikipedia with the help of a bot. In 2022,the Agency of Information and Mass Communications under the Administration of the President of the Republic of Uzbekistan officially released the OʻzME under a CC BY 4.0 license.

Content 
The National Encyclopedia of Uzbekistan has about 50,000 entries. The majority of the articles in the National Encyclopedia were directly taken from the Uzbek Soviet Encyclopedia. The bulk of the National Encyclopedia (40 percent) is devoted to subjects about Uzbekistan. About 60 percent of the articles are on social sciences and the other 40 percent are on natural sciences. The 12th volume is entirely dedicated to subjects about Uzbekistan.

The encyclopedia praises Islam Karimov, the late president of Uzbekistan, and his administration. The first volume starts with a congratulatory letter from Karimov.

See also 
 Uzbek Soviet Encyclopedia
 Culture of Uzbekistan
 Uzbek literature

References

External links 
 Official website of the National Encyclopedia of Uzbekistan 
 All volumes of the National Encyclopedia of Uzbekistan 

Uzbekistani online encyclopedias
Uzbek-language encyclopedias
National encyclopedias
2000 non-fiction books
21st-century encyclopedias